Gundula Krause (born 7 July 1966) is a German folk violinist. She lives in Mainz, Roetgen nearby Aachen and East-Clare (Ireland).

Life and work
She was born in Göttingen, Germany. She moved to Los Angeles, California, during the 1980s where she learned bluegrass and cajun music at Hollywood's Westlake College of Music. First experiences in band music she gathered in the formation The phiddleharmonics of her violin teacher Joe Miklich. She returned to Germany in 1986. At the University of Mainz she studied psychology. During this time she went to Galway and Doolin in Ireland for studying Irish folk and Folk rock. In 1992, she released her debut album, Dynamic Blend.

In the time about 1990 she was one of the first German folk violinists. She performed with a lot of bands from the Rhein-Main-area: Gundels Giganten (Mainz), Beaver Bangtree Band, The Bantree (Worms), Hibernians (Nauheim), Irish Rovers, Dagmar 41, Inbetween, Secret Paddy (all Frankfurt). Currently she plays in the jazz-folk-formation Wintergreen Goblins (Roetgen).

Award
In 1993 Gundula Krause won with Gundels Giganten the first place in the band competition of Südwestfunk Baden-Baden (Southwest-German Broadcasting Corporation Baden-Baden).

Discography
Gundels Giganten
Dynamic blend, Wiesbaden : Poni Records (PO 9202), 1992.
Enth.: Breton gavottes. Shanghai Hbf. Fisherman's friend. Red winged blackbird. Pretty Polly. Celtic circus. Breton salsa.

Hibernians
Autumn leaves, (CD 10762-01), 1995.
Enth.: Impressions of a Joint Journey. The Little Drummer. The Butterfly. Song for Ireland. Cúnnla / Morrison's. Holes. The Green Fields of France. There Was a Time. Gaoth Barra na dTonn. Dobinn's Flowery Vale. Welcome Poor Paddy Home. As I Roved out. Kilkelly.

The Bantree
The fairy tree, Worms: Rolf Bachmann, L. P. Steinkohl, 1996. 
Enth.: The fairy tree. Dúlamán. GG special. The foggy dew. Sean a chaoi. Irish home. Star of the County Down. Empty beach. Cheap chicken chick jig. Irish rover. Níl sén lá. My match is made.

In between
Christmas goes jazz (CD), 1996

Dagmar 41
Unsailable. Molecule Records 411, 2001.
Enth.: Read Me. Semaphore. Defenestration. Glass Music. Here Comes Iocasta. Eve (Cress Reference). Marinade. Normal Song. Ammonites. The Thursday Room. King Arthur's Cafe. Phosphorus. Fins. Write With No Pen. Painted Sails.

References

External links
Gundula Krause at planet-interkom 
Compact Disc of Gundula Krause with Dagmar 41

1966 births
Living people
Musicians from Göttingen
Johannes Gutenberg University Mainz alumni
German women musicians
German bluegrass fiddlers
Cajun fiddlers
Irish fiddlers
21st-century American violinists
21st-century American women musicians